Uladzimir Kazlou (Belarusian: Уладзімір Казлоў; born 20 April 1985) is a Belarusian javelin thrower. His personal best throw is 82.86.

Achievements

Seasonal bests by year
2006 - 77.27
2008 - 82.06
2009 - 78.29
2010 - 81.86
2012 - 82.86
2013 - 82.49
2015 - 76.90

References

1985 births
Living people
Belarusian male javelin throwers
Athletes (track and field) at the 2008 Summer Olympics
Athletes (track and field) at the 2012 Summer Olympics
Olympic athletes of Belarus